In linear algebra, a constrained generalized inverse is obtained by solving a system of linear equations with an additional constraint that the solution is in a given subspace. One also says that the problem is described by a system of constrained linear equations.

In many practical problems, the solution  of a linear system of equations

Constrained system of linear equations

has a solution if and only if the unconstrained system of equations 

is solvable. This means that one needs to use a generalized inverse for the solution of the constrained problem.

if the inverse on the right-hand-side exists.

Matrices